B. V. Prasad (born Barla Venkata Vara Prasad) was an Indian film director known for his works in Telugu cinema. In 1971, he directed Mattilo Manikyam which won the National Film Award for Best Feature Film in Telugu, for that year.

Filmography
1965 Sri Simhachala Kshetra Mahima
1970 Amma Kosam
1971 Mattilo Manikyam
1972 Muhammad bin Tughluq
1974 Manushullo Devudu 
1975 Tota Ramudu 
1976 Aradhana 
1978 Melu Kolupu
1978 Doodoo Basavanna 
1979 Lakshmi 
1980 Thathayya Premaleelalu 
1980 Snehamera jeevitham
1980 Chuttalunnaru Jagratta 
1981 Nayudugari Abbayyi
1983 Kurukshetramlo Sita 
1985 Ooriki Soggaadu
1986 Jeevana Raagam

Awards
National Film Awards 
National Film Award for Best Feature Film in Telugu (director) - Mattilo Manikyam (1972)

References

External links
 

Telugu film directors
20th-century Indian film directors
People from Rajahmundry
Living people
Film directors from Andhra Pradesh
Year of birth missing (living people)